William Kyle Barlow (March 13, 1936 – September 21, 2022) was an American politician in the Democratic Party and a lawyer. He was a member of the Virginia House of Delegates, representing the 64th District from 1992 to 2012.
Barlow lost his bid for an 11th term to Republican Richard L. Morris in the November 8, 2011, elections, 55% to 44%.

Barlow introduced bills for electoral reform in Virginia, including instant runoff voting, none of which became law.  During his long legislative career Barlow was a strong advocate for agriculture and public education.  

Barlow was born on March 13, 1936, on Oak Crest Farm in Isle of Wight County, Virginia. He graduated from Smithfield High School in 1954 where he was a captain of the football, basketball, and baseball teams. He earned a bachelors degree in Agricultural Economics from Virginia Tech where he served as the Regimental Commander of the Corps of Cadets and President of the Class of 1958. 

After graduating from college, Barlow served for four years as an intelligence officer in the United States Air Force during the Cold War including a tour of duty in Taiwan. After leaving the Air Force he earned a law degree from the University of Virginia Law School in 1965, and returned to Smithfield where he practiced law for more than half a century. 

Barlow died of pancreatic cancer at his home in Smithfield on September 22, 2022.

Notes

References

External links

 (constituent/campaign website)

Members of the Virginia House of Delegates
1936 births
Living people
Virginia Tech alumni
University of Virginia School of Law alumni
People from Isle of Wight County, Virginia
21st-century American politicians
People from Smithfield, Virginia